Stefano Oppo (born 12 September 1994) is an Italian rower. He competed in the men's lightweight coxless four event at the 2016 Summer Olympics and won the bronze medal in the men's lightweight double sculls at the 2020 Summer Olympics. 

Oppo is an athlete of the Centro Sportivo Carabinieri.

Achievements

References

External links

1994 births
Living people
Italian male rowers
Olympic rowers of Italy
Rowers at the 2016 Summer Olympics
People from Oristano
World Rowing Championships medalists for Italy
European Championships (multi-sport event) bronze medalists
Mediterranean Games gold medalists for Italy
Mediterranean Games medalists in rowing
Competitors at the 2018 Mediterranean Games
Rowers of Centro Sportivo Carabinieri
Rowers at the 2020 Summer Olympics
Medalists at the 2020 Summer Olympics
Olympic medalists in rowing
Olympic bronze medalists for Italy
Sportspeople from Sardinia
20th-century Italian people
21st-century Italian people